Domenico Leoni (Latin: Dominicus Leo Abrogatis; life dates unknown) was a Byzantine magister militum per Venetiae in charge of Venice in 738. Following the murder of the doge Orso Ipato in 737, the Exarch of Ravenna imposed administration by annual magistri militum on Venice. Domenico was the first of these officials. He was succeeded by Felice Cornicola. This period of government by magistri militum lasted until 742, when the fifth and last of such officials was deposed and the dogeship was restored.

Notes

References
 Samuele Romanin, Storia documentata di Venezia, Pietro Naratovich tipografo editore, Venezia, 1853.
 William Carew Hazlitt, History of the Venetian Republic: Her Rise, Her Greatness, and Her Civilization. Elder, Smith and Co.: London, 1860.

Magistri militum
Republic of Venice nobility
8th-century Doges of Venice
Republic of Venice military personnel